Neoplagioporus is a genus of trematodes in the family Opecoelidae.

Species
Neoplagioporus ayu (Takahashi, 1928) Shimazu, 1990
Neoplagioporus elongatus (Goto & Ozaki, 1930) [emend. Gibson, 1976] Shimazu, 1990
Neoplagioporus kajika Urabe & Higa, 2006
Neoplagioporus zacconis (Yamaguti, 1934) Shimazu, 1990

References

Further reading
Shimazu, T. (2017). Digeneans parasitic in freshwater fishes (Osteichthyes) of Japan, X. Opecoelidae, Plagioporinae. Bulletin of the National Museum of Nature and Science, Series A,  43(1), 1–28.

Opecoelidae
Plagiorchiida genera